Iván Ortolá Díez (born 4 August 2004) is a Spanish Grand Prix motorcycle racer competing in the 2023 Moto3 World Championship for the Angeluss MTA Team.

Career statistics

Red Bull MotoGP Rookies Cup

Races by year
(key) (Races in bold indicate pole position, races in italics indicate fastest lap)

Grand Prix motorcycle racing

By season

By class

Races by year
(key) (Races in bold indicate pole position; races in italics indicate fastest lap)

References

2004 births
Living people
Spanish motorcycle racers
Sportspeople from Valencia
Moto3 World Championship riders